The name Egeria may refer to:
Egeria (mythology), a mythological water nymph and the wife of Numa Pompilius, second king of Rome
Egeria (pilgrim), also called Aetheria, a fourth-century Christian woman who made a pilgrimage to the Holy Land and wrote a letter about her travels
HMS Egeria, any one of three Royal Navy ships
USS Egeria (ARL-8), a U.S. Navy repair ship named after the nymph
13 Egeria, an asteroid
Egeria, West Virginia, an unincorporated community
Egeria (plant), a genus of aquatic plants
"Egeria" (Rome), an episode of the television series Rome
Egeria, a character in the science fiction television series Stargate SG-1
Dutch investment company, main owner of NRC Handelsblad
 Egeria, an Armstrong Whitworth Ensign aircraft